Aphnaeus flavescens, the creamy highflier, is a butterfly in the family Lycaenidae. It is found in Malawi and Zambia.

References

Butterflies described in 1954
Aphnaeus